Philip Riefers (born March 15, 1990) is a German professional ice hockey player. He is currently playing for Krefeld Pinguine in the DEL2.

Playing career
He formerly joined Kölner Haie after his first stint with Krefeld Pinguine in the Deutsche Eishockey Liga (DEL) in 2011. After finishing the 2014–15 season with Augsburger Panther on April 30, 2015, Riefers signed a two-year contract with fellow German club, Adler Mannheim.

In his only season in Mannheim, Riefers appeared scoreless in 33 games for the 2015–16 campaign. On May 30, 2016, Riefers left Mannheim out of contract to sign a one-year deal with EHC Wolfsburg.

References

External links

1990 births
Living people
Adler Mannheim players
Augsburger Panther players
German ice hockey right wingers
Iserlohn Roosters players
Kölner Haie players
Krefeld Pinguine players
Grizzlys Wolfsburg players
Sportspeople from Krefeld